The First Protectorate Parliament was summoned by the Lord Protector Oliver Cromwell under the terms of the Instrument of Government. It sat for one term from 3 September 1654 until 22 January 1655 with William Lenthall as the Speaker of the House.

During the first nine months of the Protectorate, Cromwell with the aid of the Council of State, drew up a list of 84 bills to present to Parliament for ratification. But the members of Parliament had their own and their constituents' interests to promote and in the end not enough of them would agree to work with Cromwell, or to sign a declaration of their acceptance of the Instrument of Government, to make the constitutional arrangements in the Instrument of Government work. Cromwell dissolved the Parliament as soon as it was allowed under the terms of the Instrument of Government, having failed to get any of the 84 bills passed.

Parliamentary constituencies 
The Instrument of Government specified the numbers of members of parliament that boroughs and counties in England and Wales would send to the Parliament, totalling 400. By omission from the list, rotten boroughs were abolished. A few boroughs not previously enfranchised, notably Leeds and Manchester, received a seat. All the traditional counties were represented (Durham for the first time). In addition some well established sub-divisions of counties were given separate representation. There were substantial changes in the number of seats many constituencies received, particularly amongst the counties. This was the first systematic redistribution of Parliamentary seats in English history and would not be matched for a Royal Parliament until the Reform Act 1832.

In the list below, the name of the constituency (as specified in Section X of the Instrument of Government, with minor spelling changes) is followed by the number of seats allocated. The Boroughs in each county follow the county constituency (indicated by boldface and an * after the constituency name). Those areas marked ** were divisions of a traditional county.

The Instrument of Government also made provision for members from Jersey and Guernsey, without defining the numbers or arrangements for the election of such members. It is not clear that any were actually elected, as they are not mentioned in the Journal of the House of Commons for this Parliament. It is also notable that when on 6 and 7 October 1654 the House of Commons debated "the distribution of the number of members to serve in future Parliaments", Guibon Goddard MP recorded in his journal that "we agreed with the Instrument, in the whole number of four hundred, Jersey and Guernsey being left out, because not governed by our laws, but by municipal laws of their own; and we differed but little in the particular distribution."

The Lord Protector and his Council were given power to provide for the representation of Scotland and Ireland, which was done by later legislation giving 30 seats to each country. This was the first time Scotland and Ireland were represented in a Westminster Parliament.

Constituencies and Members of Parliament

Notes:
 Monmouthshire (3 county seats) included in England, not Wales.
Dublin City and County treated as a county constituency (2 seats).

List of constituencies

England 

Bedfordshire*: 5
Bedford Town: 1
Berkshire*: 5
Abingdon: 1
Reading: 1
Buckinghamshire*: 5
Aylesbury: 1
Buckingham Town: 1
Wycombe: 1
Cambridgeshire*: 4
Cambridge Town: 1
Cambridge University: 1
Isle of Ely**: 2
Cheshire*: 4
Chester: 1
Cornwall*: 8
East Looe & West Looe:1
Launceston: 1
Penryn: 1
Truro: 1
Cumberland*: 2
Carlisle: 1
Derbyshire*: 4
Derby Town: 1
Devonshire*: 11
Barnstable: 1
Clifton, Dartmouth, Hardness: 1
Exeter: 2
Honiton: 1
Plymouth: 2
Tiverton: 1
Totnes: 1
Dorsetshire*: 6
Dorchester: 1
Lyme-Regis: 1
Poole: 1
Weymouth and Melcombe-Regis: 1
Durham*: 2
City of Durham: 1
Essex*: 13
Colchester: 2
Maldon: 1
Gloucestershire*: 5
Cirencester: 1
Gloucester: 2
Tewkesbury: 1
Herefordshire*: 4
Hereford: 1
Leominster: 1
Hertfordshire*: 5
Hertford: 1
St. Alban's: 1
Huntingdonshire*: 3
Huntingdon: 1
Kent*: 11
Canterbury: 2
Dover: 1
Maidstone: 1
Queenborough: 1
Rochester: 1
Sandwich: 1
Lancashire*: 4
Lancaster: 1
Liverpool: 1
Manchester: 1
Preston: 1
Leicestershire*: 4
Leicester: 2
Lincolnshire*: 10
Boston: 1
Grantham: 1
Great Grimsby: 1
Lincoln: 2
Stamford: 1
Middlesex*: 4
London: 6
Westminster: 2
Monmouthshire*: 3
Norfolk*: 10
Great Yarmouth: 2
Lynn-Regis: 2
Norwich: 2
 Northamptonshire*: 6
Northampton: 1
Peterborough: 1
Nottinghamshire*: 4
Nottingham: 2
Northumberland*: 3
Berwick: 1
Newcastle upon Tyne: 1
Oxfordshire*: 5
Oxford City: 1
Oxford University: 1
Woodstock: 1
Rutlandshire*: 2
Shropshire*: 4
Bridgnorth: 1
Ludlow: 1
Shrewsbury: 2
Staffordshire*: 3
Lichfield: 1
Newcastle-under-Lyne: 1
Stafford: 1
Somersetshire*: 11
Bath: 1
Bridgwater: 1
Bristol: 2
Taunton: 2
Wells: 1
 Southamptonshire*: 8
Andover: 1
Isle of Wight**: 2
Portsmouth: 1
Southampton: 1
Winchester: 1
Suffolk*: 10
Bury St. Edmunds: 2
Dunwich: 1
Ipswich: 2
Sudbury: 1
Surrey*: 6
Guildford: 1
Reigate: 1
Southwark: 2
Sussex*: 9
Arundel: 1
Chichester: 1
East Grinstead: 1
Lewes: 1
Rye: 1
Warwickshire*: 4
Coventry: 2
Warwick: 1
Westmoreland*: 2
Wiltshire*: 10
Devizes: 1
Marlborough: 1
New Sarum: 2
Worcestershire*: 5
Worcester: 2
Yorkshire* East Riding**: 4
Beverley: 1
Kingston-upon-Hull: 1
Yorkshire* North Riding**: 4
City of York: 2
Richmond: 1
Scarborough: 1
Yorkshire* West Riding**: 6
Halifax: 1
Leeds: 1

Wales 
Brecknockshire is attributed 3 seats in the text of the Instrument of Government linked to by this article, but other on-line versions say 2 and that is consistent with the total of 400 seats for England and Wales.

 Anglesey*: 2
 Brecknockshire*: 2
 Cardiganshire*: 2
 Carmarthenshire*: 2
 Carnarvonshire*: 2
 Denbighshire*: 2
 Flintshire*: 2
 Glamorganshire*: 2
 Merionethshire*: 1
 Montgomeryshire*: 2
 Pembrokeshire*: 2
 Haverfordwest: 1
 Radnorshire*: 2

Scotland 
Provision for representation of the shires (marked *) and burghs of Scotland was made by An Ordinance by the Protector for Elections in Scotland of 27 June 1654. The Burgh, amongst those in a district, where the elections were to take place is marked in capitals. The shire of Merse is a historic name for Berwickshire.

 Aberdeen*: 1
Banff, Cullen, and ABERDEEN: 1
 Ayr and Renfrew*: 1
 Banff*: 1
 Dumbarton, Argyle, and Bute*: 1
 Dumfries*: 1
Dumfries, Sinclair, Lochmaben, Annandale, Wigton, Kirkcudbright, Whithorn, and Galloway: 1
 East-Lothian*: 1
 Elgin and Nairn*: 1
 Fife and Kinross*: 1
St. Andrews, Dysart, Kirkcaldy, Cupar, Anstruther East, Pittenween, Crail, Dunfermline, Kinghorn, Anstruther West, Inverkeithing, Kilrenny, and Burnt Island: 1
 Inverness*: 1
Dornoch, Tain, INVERNESS, Dingwall, Nairn, Elgin, and Fortrose: 1
 Kincardine and Forfar*: 1
Forfar, DUNDEE, Arbroath, Montrose, and Brechin: 1
 Lanark*: 1
Lanark, GLASGOW, Rutherglen, Rothesay, Renfrew, Ayr,Irvine and Dumbarton: 1
 Linlithgow, Stirling, and Clackmannan*: 1
Linlithgow, Queensferry, Perth, Culross, and STIRLING: 1
 Merse*: 1
Peebles, Selkirk, Jedburgh, Lauder, N. Berwick, Dunbar, and Haddington: 1
 Mid-Lothian*: 1
Edinburgh: 2
 Orkney, Shetland and Caithness*: 1
 Perth*: 1
 Roxburgh*: 1
 Selkirk and Peebles*: 1
 Sutherland, Ross and Cromarty*: 1
 Wigton*: 1

 Ireland 
Provision for representation of the counties (marked *) and boroughs of Ireland was made by An Ordinance by the Protector for Elections in Ireland of 27 June 1654. The Borough, amongst those in a district, where the elections were to take place is marked in capitals.

 Carlow, Wexford, Kilkenny and Queen's*: 2
 Cavan, Fermanagh and Monaghan*: 1
 Cork'*: 1
Cork and Youghall: 1
Bandon and Kinsale: 1
 Derry, Donegal and Tyrone*: 2
DERRY and Coleraine: 1
 Down, Antrim and Armagh*: 2
Carrickfergus and Belfast: 1
 Dublin County* and City: 2
 Galway and Mayo*: 2
 Kerry, Limerick and Clare*: 2
LIMERICK City and Killmallock: 1
 Kildare and Wicklow*: 2
 Meath and Louth*: 2
 Sligo, Roscommon and Leitrim*: 2
 Waterford and Tipperary*: 2
WATERFORD and Clonmel Cities: 1
 Westmeath, Longford and King's*: 2

The First Protectorate Parliament''' was preceded by the Barebones Parliament and succeeded by the Second Protectorate Parliament.

See also
List of parliaments of England
List of MPs elected to the English parliament in 1654

References

 Text of the Instrument of Government
 The British Civil Wars & Commonwealth website: First Protectorate Parliament 1654-55
 www.archontology.org: England: Parliament 1640-1660

Bibliography
From Cromwell:The Oliver Cromwell Website: a select bibliography of books and articles:
A number of articles explore aspects of Cromwell's Protectorate parliaments: H.R. Trevor-Roper's crucial 1956 article on 'Oliver Cromwell and his parliaments', which was included in several later collections and is perhaps most accessible in I. Roots (ed), Cromwell, A Profile (1973);
P. Gaunt, 'Law making in the first Protectorate Parliament' in C. Jones, M. Newitt & S. Roberts (eds), Politics and People in Revolutionary England (1986);
I. Roots, 'Law making in the second Protectorate Parliament' in H. Hearder & H.R. Loyn (eds), British Government and Administration (1974);
P. Gaunt, 'Cromwell's purge? Exclusions and the first Protectorate Parliament' in Parliamentary History 6 (1987);
C.S. Egloff, 'The search for a Cromwellian settlement: exclusions from the second Protectorate Parliament' in Parliamentary History 17 (1998);
D. L. Smith, ‘Oliver Cromwell, the first Protectorate Parliament and religious reform’ in Parliamentary History 19 (2000);
T.A. Wilson & F.J. Merli, 'Naylor's case and the dilemma of the Protectorate' in University of Birmingham Historical Journal 10 (1965-6); and C.H. Firth, 'Cromwell and the crown' in English Historical Review 17 & 18 (1902 & 1903).

1654 establishments in England
1655 disestablishments
1655 in England
17th-century English parliaments
Republicanism in England
Interregnum (England)
1650s disestablishments in England
The Protectorate